Zeldenrust is a name given to some windmills in Belgium, Germany and the Netherlands.

Zeldenrust, Budel, a windmill in North Brabant, the Netherlands
Zeldenrust, Dokkum a windmill in Friesland, the Netherlands
Zeldenrüst, Emden, a windmill in Lower Saxony, Germany
Zeldenrust, Geffen, a windmill in North Brabant, the Netherlands
Zeldenrust, Hooge Zwaluwe, a windmill in North Brabant, the Netherlands
Zeldenrust, Lith, a windmill in North Brabant, the Netherlands
Zeldenrust, Nieuw-Schiemda a windmill in Groningen, the Netherlands
Zeldenrust, Oss, a windmill in North Brabant, the Netherlands
Zeldenrust, Overasselt a windmill in Gelderland, the Netherlands
Zeldenrust, Viersel, a windmill in Antwerp, Belgium
Zeldenrust, Westerwijtwerd a windmill in Groningen, the Netherlands
Zeldenrust, Zuidbarge, a windmill in Drenthe, the Netherlands

People with the surname
Furhgill Zeldenrust (born 1989), Dutch footballer
Salomon Zeldenrust (1884–1958), Dutch fencer

Dutch-language surnames